Mbomo is a district in the Cuvette-Ouest Region of western Republic of the Congo. The capital lies at Mbomo.

Towns and villages

See also
 Congo Tales – a photo series book of Congolese from the Mbomo District 

Cuvette-Ouest Department
Districts of the Republic of the Congo